Hitman, is a 1998 Hong Kong action film directed by Stephen Tung. The film stars Jet Li, Eric Tsang, Simon Yam and Gigi Leung. The film was released on 3 April 1998.

Plot
In Hong Kong, a mysterious hitman known as the "King of Killers" has murdered a wealthy ex-yakuza crime boss named Tsukamoto. Because Tsukamoto had established a revenge fund in case of an assassination, a US $100 million bounty is placed upon the King. The deceased's power hungry grandson, Eiji, becomes the new head of the Tsukamoto family and one of the bounty hunters.

An ex-soldier named Fu is part of a small gang that learns of the bounty. Fu attempts to enter the building where Tsukamoto's lawyers are discussing the terms of the revenge fund, but is rebuffed by the security. When he defends himself, his martial arts skills attract the attention of Lo, a seedy small-time criminal. Lo is also seeking the bounty on the King of Killers, and agrees to hire Fu as his muscle. They are warned not to pursue the case further by Inspector Chan, a member of the Hong Kong Security Bureau. To test Fu's abilities, Lo takes on a small contract to kill a local gang member, while also outfitting Fu and allowing him to live in his home. Fu soon meets Kiki, Lo's daughter, who is a successful attorney and ashamed of her father's sleazy activities.

Martin, the head lawyer in charge of Tsukamoto's revenge fund, makes the discovery that prior to his death, the crime lord was forced to swallow old Chinese wartime promissory notes. He sells this information to the bounty hunters, and as Eiji is willing to pay the highest amount, he is the first to learn the serial codes on the notes. Fu and Lo follow Eiji to a small apartment complex, where they learn that the suspect is an old man named Uncle Leung, an acquaintance of Lo's that he had previously been searching for. Despite their best efforts fighting off multiple Yakuza hitmen and a Caucasian grenade wielding assassin disguised as a priest who Fu kills with his own grenade. Fu and Lo are unable to extract Leung, who suffers a heart attack and dies during their escape and is then shot in the head by Eiji.

Back at Lo's apartment, Lo comes clean with Fu: Years ago, he had met Uncle Leung, and in talking with him learned the old man was a veteran whose entire family was killed by the Japanese during the Second Sino-Japanese War. Now Leung wanted vengeance on his family's murderers, but the only wealth he possessed were the promissory notes. Taking pity on him, Lo told Leung to hold onto the notes and, in the event of the murder of the Japanese man he wanted dead, cash them in and forward the money to his bank account. Lo had only recently learned that Tsukamoto was the man Leung wanted to have killed, and once the crime lord had been assassinated by the King of Killers, Leung had done what Lo asked and forwarded the money from the notes to Lo's bank account. This had created a paper trail that implicated Lo as the King.

Before Fu and Lo can plan further, their apartment is suddenly attacked by two bounty hunters. They are able to barely escape, and Lo makes plans to disappear to mainland China. Before they leave however, they decide to attend Kiki's graduation party. At the event, Fu once again meets Inspector Chan and deduces that the inspector is actually the real King when he slips that he knows Lo is not really the wanted assassin. Fu and Lo then go to Eiji's penthouse to meet Martin, where Fu shoots Lo and demands to cash in on the bounty. Martin however informs them that Eiji has changed the terms of the fund so that no matter who kills the King, he will be the one who receives the money.

A massive fight ensues in the penthouse and soon Inspector Chan arrives as the King to help Fu and Lo. They are able to kill Eiji and all of his men, leaving Martin to rewrite the terms of the fund. Later, they are seen together, dividing up the money and discussing their future plans. Chan retires, and recruits Fu to act as the new King.

Cast
 Jet Li as Fu, the main character of the film, an extremely skilled melee fighter, but also a naive and inexperienced hitman in training who eventually becomes the new King
 Simon Yam as Officer Chan Kwan, a capable and determined detective who is actually the dangerous vigilante King of Killers alter ego
 Eric Tsang as Ngok Lo, a self-proclaimed "rat bastard" who makes the rent by any means necessary and is a notorious liar and cheater
 Gigi Leung as Kiki, Ngok Lo's daughter, an intelligent and beautiful lawyer who is exasperated with her father's misdoings
 Sato Keiji as Eiji Tsukamoto, a ruthless and focused yakuza member who seeks the bounty on his grandfather's killer
 Paul Rapovski as The Tall Guy, Tsukamoto's lead bodyguard and a skilled, if not cheap, fighter
 Ip Kwong-kim as Martin, a lawyer in charge of the revenge fund who is not above lying to make a profit
 Hideri Meiken as Sasaki, a Japanese karate practitioner who is Tsukamoto's bodyguard
 Sahara Kenji as Tsukamoto, a sleazy and notorious ex-yakuza boss who is assassinated by the King at the beginning of the film
 Timmy Ho as David Wu, a detective in charge of finding and exposing the King
 Ching Tung as Kau, a small town triad lieutenant who was briefly Fu's boss
 Frankie Ng as a father and triad boss at an amusement park who was erroneously believed to be the King

Release
On 16 October 2000, DVD was released by Hong Kong Legends in the United Kingdom in Region 2. Five years later, The Jet Li Collection DVD was released on 25 July 2005 at a 2 disc set including The Master. In 2002, an edited version with a hip-hop soundtrack was released on DVD in the United States as Contract Killer.

Reception
Derek Elley of Variety called it "an above-average blend of comedy and action".  Scott Hill of PopMatters reviewed the Contract Killer edit of the film, calling it "a diluted reissue" and advised viewers to watch original with subtitles to "see the real film".

Accolades

See also
 Jet Li filmography
 List of Hong Kong films

References

External links
 
 

1998 films
1998 action comedy films
1998 martial arts films
1990s martial arts comedy films
1990s Cantonese-language films
China Star Entertainment Group films
Films about contract killing
Films set in Hong Kong
Hong Kong action comedy films
Hong Kong martial arts comedy films
Yakuza films
1990s Japanese films
1990s Hong Kong films